Giovanni Battista Ameglio was an Italian general. He was the governor of Cyrenaica between (1913-1918), and in 1915, while still at office, was assigned as governor of Tripolitania.
 

Military personnel from Palermo
Italian colonial governors and administrators
Italian generals
1854 births
1921 deaths
Italian military personnel of the Italo-Turkish War